Christian Redl (born 20 April 1948) is a German actor and singer.

Life 
Christian Redl is the son of a teacher. He grew up in Kassel, trained from 1967 to 1970 at the Schauspielschule Bochum and was then engaged in theatres in Wuppertal, Frankfurt, Bremen, and Hamburg, where he worked with Claus Peymann, Luc Bondy, and Peter Zadek. In 1986, he starred in his first big role in a cinema production, which is Uwe Schrader's . He became well-known in the end of the 1980s and the beginning of the 1990s for films by Bernd Schadewald, especially for his lead role in the 1990 TV film , for which he earned the Grimme-Preis and for the 1994 film , for which he was nominated for a Telestar award.

Along with his theatre work, there were more TV productions, in which he worked with Matti Geschonneck holding a special place: Der Rosenmörder, Ein mörderischer Plan, and Späte Rache. Two more cinema productions were Lea directed by Ivan Fíla and  directed by Hermine Huntgeburth. He also starred as Generaloberst Alfred Jodl in the 2004 Oliver Hirschbiegel film Downfall. Redl also played abysmal figures in the German film Tattoo directed by Robert Schwentke and in the ZDF police film series Nachtschicht by Lars Becker. He is regularly seen in cinema and TV productions, especially in TV thrillers like the ZDF series KDD – Kriminaldauerdienst and in international films like Krabat by Marco Kreuzpaintner and Die Päpstin by Sönke Wortmann. At the Hamburger Kammerspiele, he starred in Kunst and Der Totmacher, and at the St.-Pauli-Theater in the Dreigroschenoper, in Sonny Boys, and in Arsen und Spitzenhäubchen. In the spring of 2009, he starred in Tod in der Eifel, a TV film directed by Johannes Grieser, and in Der Tote im Spreewald. Since 2006, Redl starred as the laconic and lonely commissioner Thorsten Krüger in the ZDF crime series Spreewaldkrimi, playing in Spreewald, where the aftermaths of which are sporadically filmed. In 2013, he won the German Academy of Television award for best supporting actor for his role in Marie Brand und die offene Rechnung.

He also works as an audiobook speaker and musician.

Christian Redl had been dating actress Maja Maranow for many years. He is the stepbrother of actor Wolf Redl.

Selected filmography 

1987:  - Fred
1990:  (TV Movie) - Erich Rohloff
1991: Verurteilt: Anna Leschek (TV Movie) - Günther Siebert
1992: Schattenboxer - Rasselin
1992–1997: Der Fahnder (TV Series) - Robert Tiedemann
1992–2010: Ein Fall für zwei (TV Series) - Bernhard Wartenburg / Rudolf / Georg Kring
1994:  (TV Movie) - Herwig Seitz
1994: Doppelter Einsatz (TV Series) - Uhlstedt
1994:  (TV Movie) - Erwin's father
1995: Satan's Children (TV Movie) - Pfarrer
1995:  - Kommissar Goethals
1996: Die Kommissarin (TV Series) - Julius Winterberg
1996: Wolffs Revier (TV Series) - Olaf Abt
1996: Ein starkes Team (TV Series) - Holm
1996: Lea - Strehlow
1997: Die Gang (TV Series) - Paul Zwingler
1997: Sperling (TV Series)
1997: Child Murder (TV Movie) - Oskar Lehmann
1997: Koerbers Akte: Kleines Mädchen – Großes Geld (TV Movie) - Herr Wilms
1997: The Darkness Experiment - Professor Havlik
1997: Angeschlagen (TV Movie) - Chef
1998: Vicky's Nightmare (TV Movie) - Kommissar Wachsmann
1998:  - Karl
1998: Bertolt Brecht - Liebe, Revolution und andere gefährliche Sachen
1998: Hundert Jahre Brecht - Baal
1998: Der Rosenmörder (TV Movie) - Georg Taubert
1998:  - Thomas Hecht
1998–1999: Zwei Brüder (TV Series) - Leo Passlack / Passlack
1999: Urlaub auf Leben und Tod (TV Movie) - Popeye
1999: Oscar und Leni - Oskar
1999: Federmann (TV Movie) - Federmann
1999:  - Brilli
1999: Gangster - Duvall
1999: Sturmzeit (TV Series) - Victor Domberg
2000: Das gestohlene Leben (TV Movie) - Bruno Stein
2000: Anwalt Abel (TV Series) - Claudius
2000: Mordkommission (TV Series)
2000: Ein mörderischer Plan (TV Movie) - Robert Pfaff
2000: Einer geht noch (TV Movie) - Heinzi Schämpp
2000: Die Straßen von Berlin (TV Series)
2000: Aberdeen (German version)
2001: Die Verbrechen des Professor Capellari (TV Series) - C.C. Brinkmann
2001: Späte Rache (TV Movie) - Klaus Klempow
2002: Tattoo - Minks
2002:  (TV Movie) - Innenminister Langheinrich
2002:  (TV Movie) - Kommissar Tönning
2003: Der Aufstand (TV Movie) - Beria (Head of KGB)
2003: Nachts, wenn der Tag beginnt (TV Movie) - Dr. Friedrich Thomasius
2003: Die Geisel (TV Movie) - Vollmer
2003-2009: Tatort (TV Series) - Egon Pohl / Kriminaldirektor Volker Römhild / Robert Brandstetter / Gernot Dietz / Erich Blacher
2004: Das Duo (TV Series) - Ole Krogmann
2004: Der Untergang - General Alfred Jodl
2004-2011: Nachtschicht (TV Series) - Clemente / Rudi Sakora / Rudi
2005: Spiele der Macht – 11011 Berlin (TV Movie)
2005: Die letzte Schlacht (TV Movie) - General Hans Krebs
2005: Schimanski (TV Series) - Gaubner
2005: Unter Verdacht: Das Karussell (TV Series) - Janker
2005:  (TV Series) - Ulrich Claussen
2006: Wilsberg (TV Series) - Debelius
2006: Als der Fremde kam (TV Movie) - Mathias Wernicke
2006-2019: Spreewaldkrimi (TV Series) - Kommissar Thorsten Krüger
2007: Post Mortem (TV Series) - Pater Arrango
2007: Yella - Yellas Vater
2007: Alarm für Cobra 11 (TV Series) - Roman Gehlen
2007: KDD – Kriminaldauerdienst (TV Series) - Rainer Sallek
2207: Die Schatzinsel - Billy Bones
2008:  (TV Movie) - Renz
2008: Krabat - Meister - Evil Sorcerer
2008: Tod in der Eifel (TV Movie) - Rolf Schanz
2009:  (TV Movie) - Ludwig Schöngau
2009: Die Päpstin - Abbot of Fulda
2010: Der Kriminalist (TV Series) - Gerhard Bendix
2010: Der Uranberg (TV Movie) - Gottlieb Meinel
2011: SOKO Wismar (TV Series) - Benno Grabert
2011: Polizeiruf 110 (TV Series) - Hubert Marka
2011: Der Staatsanwalt (TV Series) - Lukas Vogt
2011-2016: Küstenwache (TV Series) - Gerd Thiele / Nils Rudolph
2012: White Tiger – Die große Panzerschlacht (Belyy tigr) - Keytel
2013: Marie Brand und die offene Rechnung (TV Movie) - Markus Rombach
2013: Das Jerusalem-Syndrom (TV Movie)
2014: Schuld um Schuld (Short) - Konrad
2015:  (TV Movie) - Gustav Lederer
2015: Bella Block (TV Series) - Inspekteur der Marine Schelling
2015: Frau Roggenschaubs Reise (TV Movie) - Klaus Roggenschaub
2016: Die Chefin (TV Series) - Josef Köhler
2017: Killing Tide: A Brittany Mystery (TV Series) - Charles Morin
2017: Verräter (TV Movie) - Gerd
2018: The Old Fox (TV Series) - Robert Krüger
2018: Mackie Messer – Brechts Dreigroschenfilm - Tiger Brown
2018: Kaisersturz (TV Movie) - Friedrich Ebert
2019: Die Toten von Salzburg (TV Series) - Jan Torbeck
2019: Flucht durchs Höllental (TV Movie) - Georg Wendt
2020: Der Bozen-Krimi (TV Series) - Enzo Saffione

Selected radioplays 
 1977: Victor Hugo: Der letzte Tag eines Verurteilten – Editing und Director: Charles Benoit (Hörspiel – SR DRS)
 1985: Mario Benedetti: Pedro und der Hauptmann – Director: Charles Benoit (SR DRS)
 1989: Margaret Millar: Kannibalenherz – Director: Bernd Lau (Hörspiel – NDR)
 1991: Adolf Schröder: Berger und Levin – Director: Bernd Lau (NDR)
 1992: J. R. R. Tolkien: Der Herr der Ringe – Director: Bernd Lau (WDR + SWR)
 1993: Tankred Dorst: Merlin oder das wüste Land (Sänger) – Director: Walter Adler (Hörspiel – MDR)
 1994: Hanspeter Gschwend: Code-Execute – Director: Charles Benoit (SR DRS)
 1996: Yasmina Reza: Kunst – Director: Christiane Ohaus – Hörspiel Radio Bremen
 1997: Dirk Spelsberg: Going Home – Director: Norbert Schaeffer Hörspiel SDR
 1999: Ken Follett: Die Säulen der Erde (Philip) – Director: Leonhard Koppelmann (Hörspiel (9 Teile) – WDR)
 1999: Jack Kerouac: Am Schwimmbecken sitzen mit Blondinen – Editing und Director: Charles Benoit (SR DRS)
 2000: Yasmina Reza: Drei Mal Leben – Director: Charles Benoit (SR DRS)
 2002: Felix Thijssen: Cleopatra – Director: Norbert Schaeffer (WDR)
 2003: Maud Tabachnik: Bellende Hunde beißen – Director: Martin Zylka (Hörspiel – WDR)
 2003: Carlo Fruttero/Franco Lucentini: Die Farbe des Schicksals (Inzaghi) – Director: Hans Gerd Krogmann (Hörspiel – SWR)
 2004: Daniel Danis: Kieselasche - Director: Ulrich Lampen (Deutschlandradio)
 2005: Carlos Ruiz Zafón: Der Schatten des Windes – Director: Martin Zylka (WDR)
 2005: Charlotte Bronte: Jane Eyre – Director: Christiane Ohaus – Hörspiel Radio Bremen
 2005: Karlheinz Koinegg: Ritter Artus und die Ritter der Tafelrunde (Sir Bercilac) – Director: Angeli Backhausen (Kinderhörspiel (6 Teile) – WDR)
 2006: Robert Harris: Pompeji – Editing/Director: Sven Stricker – Hörspiel Der Hörverlag
 2008: James Graham Ballard: Karneval der Alligatoren – Editing/Director: Oliver Sturm Hörspiel – NDR
 2008: Philippe Blasband: Die Zeugen – Director: Marguerite Gateau – Hörspiel (DKultur/SR)
 2009: David Harrower: Blackbird – Director: Ulrich Lampen Hörspiel SWR
 2009: Jürgen Fuchs: Magdalena – Director: Norbert Schaeffer Hörspiel WDR
 2010: Tennessee Williams: Licht unter Tage – Director: Annette Kurth (WDR)
 2012: Renate Görgen: Der hinkende Hund – Director: Alexander Schumacher – Hörspiel NDR
 2012: Georg Heym: Der Irre – Director: Iris Drögekamp – Hörspiel SWR
 2012: Urs Widmer: Das Ende vom Geld – Director: Ulrich Lampen (Hörspiel – HR)
 2012: David Grossmann: Eine Frau flieht vor einer Nachricht – Director: Norbert Schaeffer (Hörspiel NDR)
 2013: Jakob Arjouni: Bruder Kemal – Editing und Director: Alexander Schuhmacher (NDR)
 2013: John Burnside: Fügung – Director: Iris Drögekamp (SWR)
 2014: Andres Veiel: Das Himbeerreich – Director: Ulrich Lampen (Hörspiel – RBB/HR)
 2014: Iris Drögekamp: Als mein Vater ein Busch wurde und ich meinen Namen verlor – Director: Iris Drögekamp (Kinderhörspiel – SWR)
 2014: Natascha Wodin/Wolfgang Hilbig: Nachtgeschwister, provisorisch – Director: Ulrich Lampen (Hörspiel – MDR/DKultur)
 2014: Tim O’Brien: Was sie trugen/The Things They Carried – Director: Harald Krewer (Hörspiel – DKultur)
 2015: Andres Foulques: Der Schlachtenmaler – Director: Alexander Schumacher – Hörspiel NDR
 2015: Joel Dicker: Die Wahrheit über den Fall Harry Quebert – Director: Leonard Koppelmann – Hörspiel NDR
 2015: Michel Houellebecq: Unterwerfung – Director: Leonard Koppelmann – Hörspiel SWR
 2016: Ingo Schulze: Augusto, der Richter. – Director: Ulrich Lampen, MDR/BR Hörspiel und Medienkunst.l.
 2016: John Williams: Augustus – Director: Burkhard Schmid
 2016: Steven Uhly: Königreich der Dämmerung – Director: Leonard Koppelmann
 2018: Claude Simon: Das Pferd – Director: Ulrich Lampen
 2018: Hilary Mantel: Brüder – Director: Walter Adler (WDR)
 2019: Eingreifen, bevor die Nacht kommt  – Director: Ullrich Lampen
 2019: Staatsräte – Director: Frank Hertweck/Manfred Hess  (SWR 2)
 2019: Roter Glamour – Director: Beatrix Ackers (NDR)
 2019: Toter Winkel – Director: Ullrich Lampen (NDR)
 2019: Denn sie sterben jung – Director: Matthias Kapohl (NDR)

Discography 
 1990: Vierzehnundeinviertel Jahr – Lieder von François Villon (Singer, Music: Frank and Stefan Wulff)
 2003: François Villon
 2003: Van Gogh. Briefe an seinen Bruder Theo
 2003: Dostojewskij – Aufzeichnungen aus dem Kellerloch
 2005: Christa-Maria Zimmermann: Gefangen im Packeis. Sprecher
 2005: Das Wilde Herz (own songs)
 2007: G. Simenon – Betty
 2007: Baudelaire – Liebesgedichte
 2008: Rilke – Liebesgedichte
 2008: James Graham Ballard: Karneval der Alligatoren. Editing/Director: Oliver Sturm,  NDR 2008.
 2009: Deutsche Schauerballaden
 2010: Baudelaire – Die Blumen des Bösen, Goldbek Rekords
 2014: Sehnsucht (own songs)
 2016: Louise (Francois Villon / Paul Zech)
 2016: John Williams: Augustus – Role: Augustus – HR 2 2016

Literature 
 Christian Redl, in: Internationales Biographisches Archiv 10/2013 on 5 March 2013, in the Munzinger-Archiv

Links 
 
 
 Christian Redl auf Filmmakers.de

References 

1948 births
Living people
20th-century German male actors
20th-century German male singers
21st-century German male actors
21st-century German male singers
Actors from Kassel
Actors from Schleswig-Holstein
Audiobook narrators
German male film actors
German male singer-songwriters
German male television actors
Male actors from Hamburg
Musicians from Kassel
Musicians from Schleswig-Holstein